Independent Green Voice (IGV) is a far-right political party in Scotland. Founded by Alistair McConnachie, it was registered with the Electoral Commission in March 2003. It received 9,756 regional votes at the 2021 Scottish Parliament election, the ninth highest of any party, possibly due to voters mistakenly voting for it instead of the Scottish Greens, which had campaigned on a platform in support of Scottish independence, drawing enough votes away from the Scottish Greens to prevent them from receiving an additional two seats in the Scottish Parliament.

Overview
Independent Green Voice was founded by Alistair McConnachie, a far-right activist and former Scottish organiser for the UK Independence Party (UKIP) who was refused renewal of his membership for questioning the Holocaust.

From its 2003 launch until March 2021, two months before the election, IGV's logo consisted of a right forearm with a clenched hand making the thumbs up sign. On 23 March 2021, the party registered a new logo with the Electoral Commission that consists of an image of a leaf and the words "Independent Green Voice" in capital letters, with "Green" being in a larger font than "Independent" or "Voice". After the election, the Scottish Greens (no relation) claimed that IGV may have deprived them of two seats due to the latter's misleading name and logo. The Scottish Greens reported that they had complained to the Electoral Commission about the name when IGV was first registered. The Greens were 1,000 votes short of gaining a list seat in Glasgow (where IGV received 2,210 votes) and 100 votes short of gaining one in South Scotland (where IGV received 1,690 votes).

On 22 May, the Electoral Commission ruled out an investigation.

Electoral history

Scottish Parliament

References

Far-right political parties in the United Kingdom
Far-right politics in the United Kingdom
Far-right politics in Scotland
Political party alliances in the United Kingdom
Political parties established in 2003
Political parties in Scotland
Unionism in Scotland